Ashlon Davids (born 24 June 1993) is a South African professional rugby union player for the  in the Currie Cup and the Rugby Challenge. His regular position is fly-half or fullback.

Career

Youth / Boland

Davids earned a number of call-ups to represent his home provincial union Boland at youth tournaments at high school level – he played for them at the 2009 Under-16 Grant Khomo Week tournament and at the Under-18 Craven Week tournaments in both 2010 and 2011, scoring one try in each of the latter two tournaments. He was also included in the  team that played in Division B of the 2011 Under-19 Provincial Championship, kicking five points in three appearances.

Golden Lions

He was the first choice fly-half for their Under-19 side in the 2012 Under-19 Provincial Championship, starting ten of their twelve matches during the regular season and playing off the bench in the other two matches. The Golden Lions finished in fourth position on the log to qualify for the semi-finals and Davids started in the semi-final, where a 14–24 defeat to  eliminated them from the competition.

He made seven appearances for the  side in the 2013 Under-21 Provincial Championship – all of those as a replacement – and scored one try in their match against  in a 23–25 defeat as his side finished in fourth spot. He appeared off the bench in their semi-final match, but was on the losing side as  won the match 44–41 after extra time.

Davids started the 2014 season representing university side  in the 2014 Varsity Cup competition. He started all seven of their matches in a disappointing campaign as they failed to win a single match and were relegated to the 2015 Varsity Shield. He was Wits' joint-highest try scorer and second-highest points scorer, contributing 13 points during the competition. Starting eleven of the s' matches in the 2014 Under-21 Provincial Championship and coming on as a replacement in the other two, Davids also contributed three tries during the campaign – against  in a 113–3 win, Gauteng rivals  and the  side – to help the Golden Lions finish in third spot. However, for the third year in a row, Davids tasted defeat at this stage of the season as they lost 19–23 to a Blue Bulls side that won the title a week later.

After playing no first class rugby in 2015, Davids was again included in the Golden Lions' squad for the 2015 Vodacom Cup. The Golden Lions finished the regular season with seven wins out of seven to qualify for the quarter finals.

In July 2015, Davids joined Potchefstroom-based side  during their 2015 Currie Cup qualification campaign.

References

South African rugby union players
Living people
1993 births
People from Malmesbury, Western Cape
Rugby union fly-halves
Rugby union fullbacks
Golden Lions players
Leopards (rugby union) players
Lions (United Rugby Championship) players
Pumas (Currie Cup) players
Griquas (rugby union) players
Rugby union players from the Western Cape